Tara Tipa  (born January 9, 1996,  in Thailand), nickname Boat, is a Thai model, actor

Early life 
Tara Tipa was born on January 9, 1996, in Aranyaprathet District. Sa Kaeo Province, Thailand graduated from Samrejvittaya School (Up to Mattayom 3) and graduating from high school School of Science-Mathematics Plan Chanhunbamphen School Currently studying at School of Digital Media & Cinematic Arts Bangkok University

Career  
Boat enters the industry by walking to the Nagara shirt room and still walking in Bangkok International. With good looks, plus the skills to make the boat play the music video (W8) of artist Gene Kasidit and Boet used to play a semi-stage sitcom, My Melody 360 Ongsa Rak as Sun

And the drama that made Fai Ruk Plerng Kaen  it known by playing the role as Tanyagorn (Lek)

Filmography

Television series

Music videos 
 ร (W8) Artist Gene Kasidit (2013)

Ost 
 ให้ความรักโอบกอด (Ost. My Melody 360 Ongsa Rak) with Apsarasiri Intarakasin, Chontida Asavahame, Mongkol kitsawang, David Bunrin   
 รักดี (Rak Dee Ost.Sang Tien)

References

External links  
 
  (Instagramfanclub)

1996 births
Living people
Tara Tipa
Tara Tipa
Tara Tipa
Tara Tipa